Bubon or Boubon was a city of ancient Lycia noted by Stephanus of Byzantium; the ethnic name, he adds, ought to be Βουβώνιος, but it is Βουβωνεύς, for the Lycians rejoice in this form. The truth of this observation of Stephanus is proved by the inscription found on the spot: Βουβωνέων ἡ Βουλὴ καὶ ὁ Δῆμος. 

Bubon is located west of ancient Balbura, near Ibecik, as confirmed by modern scholars. The city stood on a hill side commanding the entrance to the pass over the mountains.

Bubon is mentioned by Pliny, Ptolemy, and Hierocles. Pliny mentions a kind of chalk (creta) that was found about Bubon.  

Bubon, along with Balbura and Oenoanda formed the district of Cabalia.

There is a small theatre built of sandstone and on the summit of the hill was the acropolis.

Bishopric 

Bubon was a Christian bishopric, a suffragan of the metropolitan see of Myra, the capital of the Roman province of Lycia. The names of two of its bishops, both called Romanus, are recorded in extant documents. One of them was at the First Council of Constantinople in 381. The other attended the Council of Chalcedon in 451 and was a signatory of the protest letter that the bishops of the province of Lycia sent in 458 to Byzantine Emperor Leo I the Thracian over the killing of Proterius of Alexandria.

No longer a residential bishopric, Bubon is today listed by the Catholic Church as a titular see.

References

Further reading
 H. A. Ekinci: Boubon kurtarma kazısı 1993 [Excavations in Bubon 1993]. In: V. Müze Kurtarma Kazıları Semineri, Didim 25 - 28 nisan 1994. Ankara 1995, S. 333-343.
 Hansgerd Hellenkemper, Friedrich Hild: Lykien und Pamphylien. Tabula Imperii Byzantini 8. Wien 2004, S. 487-489.
 Jale İnan: Der Bronzetorso im Burdur-Museum aus Bubon und der Bronzekopf im J. Paul Getty Museum. In: Istanbuler Mitteilungen 27-28, 1977-78, S. 267-287.
 Jale İnan: Der Bronzetorso im Typ des Diskophoros von Polyklet im Burdur-Museum. In: Polykletforschungen. Berlin 1993, S. 41-56.
 Jale İnan: Neue Forschungen zum Sebasteion von Boubon und seinen Statuen. In: Akten des II. Internationalen Lykien-Symposions, Wien 6.-12. Mai 1990. Bd. 1, Wien 1993, S. 213-239.
 Jale İnan: Boubon sebasteionu ve heykelleri üzerine son araştırmalar. [Recent studies on Sebasteion and the statues of Bubon] Arkeoloji ve Sanat Yayınları, İstanbul 1994.
 Christopher P. Jones: Some new inscriptions from Bubon. In: Istanbuler Mitteilungen 27-28, 1977-78, S. 288-296.
 Christina Kokkinia (ed):  (Boubon. The Inscriptions and Archaeological Remains: A Survey 2004-2006. Athens 2008")  (Review by N. P. Milner).
 A. P. Kozloff: Bubon. A re-assessment of the provenance. In: Bulletin of the Cleveland Museum of Art 74, 1987, S. 131-143.
 N. Milner: An inscription from Bubon. In: Studies in the history and topography of Lycia and Pisidia. In memoriam A. S. Hall. London 1994, S. 93-94.
 Friedrich Schindler: Die Inschriften von Bubon (Nordlykien). Wien 1972 (Österreichische Akademie der Wissenschaften. Philosophisch-Historische Klasse. Sitzungsberichte 278, 3; Text of the inscriptions).

External links
Bubon at the Princeton Encyclopedia of Classical Sites

Populated places in ancient Lycia
Catholic titular sees in Asia
Ancient Greek archaeological sites in Turkey
Former populated places in Turkey
Buildings and structures in Burdur Province
History of Burdur Province
Archaeological sites in the Mediterranean Region, Turkey
Geography of Burdur Province
Tourist attractions in Burdur Province
Gölhisar District